Claude DeBellefeuille  (born December 13, 1963) is a Canadian politician serving as the member of Parliament (MP) for the riding of Salaberry—Suroît in Quebec since the 2019 federal election. A member of the Bloc Québécois (BQ), she previously served as the MP for Beauharnois—Salaberry from 2006 to 2011.

Background 
Born in Salaberry-de-Valleyfield, Quebec, DeBellefeuille was a social worker before becoming a politician. She was first elected in the 2006 federal election in the riding of Beauharnois—Salaberry. She defeated Alain Boire in the nomination race in the riding and went on to win the general election. DeBellefeuille was reelected in 2008 with a slightly higher margin than the previous election. Between June 2010 and May 2011, she replaced Michel Guimond as the chief Bloc Québécois Whip, previously serving as Deputy Whip. In the 2011 federal election, DeBellefeuille was a casualty of the Orange Wave, losing her seat to Anne Minh-Thu Quach of the New Democratic Party (NDP). In 2015, she ran in Salaberry—Suroît and was again defeated by Quach. DeBellefeuille went on to succeed Quach did not run in the 2019 federal election.

On June 17, 2020 DeBellefeuille spoke as party whip following fellow Bloc Québécois MP Alain Therrien was called a ‘racist’ by New Democratic Party leader Jagmeet Singh after he voted against a motion to address systemic racism and discrimination in the RCMP. On June 18, 2020 DeBellefeuille called for Singh to be blocked from speaking in Parliament due to the previous day’s ‘outburst’ but was unsuccessful.

Electoral record

References

External links 
 

1963 births
Bloc Québécois MPs
Women members of the House of Commons of Canada
French Quebecers
Living people
Members of the House of Commons of Canada from Quebec
People from Salaberry-de-Valleyfield
Women in Quebec politics
21st-century Canadian politicians
21st-century Canadian women politicians